Pseudojana roepkei is a moth in the family Eupterotidae. It was described by Nieuwenhuis in 1948. It is found on Sulawesi.

References

Moths described in 1948
Eupterotinae